Antoine-Labelle is a regional county municipality located in the Laurentides region of Quebec, Canada. Its seat is Mont-Laurier. It is named for Antoine Labelle.

Subdivisions
There are 28 subdivisions within the RCM:

Cities & Towns (2)
 Mont-Laurier
 Rivière-Rouge

Municipalities (14)
 Chute-Saint-Philippe
 Ferme-Neuve
 Kiamika
 Lac-des-Écorces
 Lac-du-Cerf
 Lac-Saint-Paul
 La Macaza
 L'Ascension
 Mont-Saint-Michel
 Nominingue
 Notre-Dame-de-Pontmain
 Notre-Dame-du-Laus
 Saint-Aimé-du-Lac-des-Îles
 Sainte-Anne-du-Lac

Villages (1)
 Lac-Saguay

Unorganized Territory (11)
 Baie-des-Chaloupes
 Lac-Akonapwehikan
 Lac-Bazinet
 Lac-De La Bidière
 Lac-de-la-Maison-de-Pierre
 Lac-de-la-Pomme
 Lac-Douaire
 Lac-Ernest
 Lac-Marguerite
 Lac-Oscar
 Lac-Wagwabika

Demographics

Population

Language

Transportation

Access Routes
Highways and numbered routes that run through the municipality, including external routes that start or finish at the county border:

 Autoroutes
 None

 Principal Highways
 
 

 Secondary Highways
 
 
 

 External Routes
 None

Airports
 Rivière-Rouge/Mont-Tremblant International Airport (La Macaza)
 Aéroport de Mont-Laurier (Mont-Laurier)
 Hydrobase Ste-Véronique (Rivière-Rouge, secteur Sainte-Véronique)

Protected Areas
Mont-Tremblant National ParkInformation Centers/ Camp Areas:

 Lac Cache
 Post d'accueil de la Cache

Papineau-Labelle Wildlife ReserveInformation Centers/ Camp Areas:

 Accueil Pie IX
 Benjamin
 Camp de gardien
 Camp du gardien (on Lac Joinville)
 Camp du gardien (on Lac Ernest)
 Caragana
 Corbeau
 De l'Averse
 De l'Hote
 Desaulniers
 Du Sourd
 Entree Benjamin
 Entree Corbeau
 Entree Du Sourd
 Entree Louvigny
 Fascinant
 Flood
 Heron
 Lac-du-Sourd
 Lac-Ernest
 Lac-Joinville
 Lagace
 Leclerc
 Le Mesange/Vieux Foyer
 Letourneau
 Quatre-Temps
 Sept Freres
 Tarte
 Travers
 Wisik/Calliergon/Trille

Rouge-Matawin Wildlife ReserveInformation Centers/ Camp Areas:

 Entree de La Macaza
 Poste d'accueil de La Macaza
 Poste d'accueil de l'Ascension

Zones d'exploitation contrôlée:

ZEC Le Sueur
ZEC Mitchinamecus
ZEC Normandie
ZEC Petawaga

Attractions
 Armand-Lachaine Covered Bridge [1906] (Chute-Saint-Philippe)
 Exposition de Mont-Laurier Centre (Mont-Laurier)
 Ferme-Rouge Covered Bridge [1903] (Kiamika/Saint-Aimé-du-Lac-des-Îles)
 La Gare Centre of Exposition [1903] (L'Annonciation)
 Macaza Covered Bridge [1904] (La Macaza)
 Mont-Laurier Airport (Des Ruisseaux)
 P'tit-train du Nord trail

See also

Related articles
 List of regional county municipalities and equivalent territories in Quebec
 Rouge-Matawin Wildlife Reserve
 Mont-Tremblant National Park
 Rouge River (Quebec)

References

External links
MRC d'Antoine-Labelle

 
Mont-Laurier